From List of National Natural Landmarks, these are the National Natural Landmarks in Kentucky.  There are 7 in total, 1 is shared with Indiana.

Kentucky
National Natural Landmarks